Węzina  is a settlement in the administrative district of Gmina Przystajń, within Kłobuck County, Silesian Voivodeship, in southern Poland.

The settlement has a population of 46.

References

Villages in Kłobuck County